Veikko Haukkavaara (October 3, 1921, Tampere – August 4, 2004) was a Finnish artist. He is best known for his sculptures welded out of pieces of metal.

Veikko Haukkavaara lived most of his life in Tampere.

External links 
 Veikko Haukkavaara on the web page of Tampere

1921 births
2004 deaths
People from Tampere
20th-century Finnish sculptors